John Sasser McKee (July 16, 1877 – April 22, 1950) was an American college football coach and physician. He served as the head football coach at North Carolina College of Agriculture and Mechanic Arts—now known as North Carolina State University from 1899 to 1900 and Georgia Tech in 1901, compiling a career coaching record of 5–7–3.

McKee was born and grew up in Raleigh, North Carolina, the son of Dr. James McKee and Mildred Sasser McKee. He received his secondary education at the Raleigh Male Academy. McKee enrolled at the University of North Carolina and played on the North Carolina Tar Heels football team from 1897 to 1898 as tackle.  While at the school, he was also a member of the Zeta Psi Fraternity.

After graduation, McKee coached at North Carolina A&M from 1899 to 1900, leading his teams to record of 1–7–2 two seasons. In 1901, he coached at Georgia Tech, guiding the 1901 Georgia Tech football team to a record of 4–0–1. After Georgia Tech's season ended, McKee joined the staff of the 1901 Georgia Bulldogs football team in their preparation against Auburn. McKee sued the Georgia Tech in June 1902 for breach of contract for the amount of $500.

Following his football coaching career, he received a medical degree from the University of Maryland School of Medicine in 1907, and entered into medical practice in his hometown of Raleigh. During World War I, McKee achieved the rank of major in the American Expeditionary Forces as a field surgeon with the 1st Gas Regiment. McKee returned to Raleigh after the war where he was the city physician until 1948. “Dr. John” was very well known throughout the state of North Carolina for his gruff but compassionate sense of humor and his propensity to curse. He loved to drive a T-Model Ford automobile. When Ford discontinued the car, McKee refused to drive any longer despite the fact he was issued a new Buick every year by the Raleigh city fathers, and police officers and firemen took him on his rounds every morning. McKee died in Morganton, North Carolina on April 22, 1950, at the home of his son, Dr. John S. McKee, Jr., superintendent of the Broughton State Mental Hospital.

Head coaching record

References

External links
 

1877 births
1950 deaths
19th-century players of American football
20th-century American physicians
American football tackles
Georgia Bulldogs football coaches
Georgia Tech Yellow Jackets football coaches
NC State Wolfpack football coaches
North Carolina Tar Heels football players
United States Army officers
United States Army personnel of World War I
University of Maryland School of Medicine alumni
Sportspeople from Raleigh, North Carolina
Players of American football from Raleigh, North Carolina